Watery Grave is the third historical mystery novel about Sir John Fielding by Bruce Alexander.

Plot summary
When the captain of a British warship falls overboard and drowns, a Naval court martial is convened to investigate a charge of murder.  Sir John is petitioned by an old friend to aid in the investigation.

1996 American novels
Sir John Fielding series
Historical crime novels
American mystery novels
American historical novels
G. P. Putnam's Sons books